William Herbert may refer to:

Earls of Pembroke
William Herbert, 1st Earl of Pembroke (died 1469) (c. 1423–1469)
William Herbert, 2nd Earl of Pembroke (1451–1491)
William Herbert, 1st Earl of Pembroke (died 1570) (c. 1501–1570), Tudor period noble and courtier
William Herbert, 3rd Earl of Pembroke (1580–1630)
William Herbert, 6th Earl of Pembroke (c. 1640–1674), English nobleman and politician
William Herbert, 18th Earl of Pembroke (born 1978)

Other peers
William Herbert, 1st Baron Powis (1572–1655), an English peer and landowner 
William Herbert, 1st Marquess of Powis (1626–1696), an English peer and landowner
William Herbert, 2nd Marquess of Powis (1665–1745), an English and later British peer and landowner
William Herbert, 3rd Marquess of Powis (1698–1748), a British peer and landowner

Others
William Herbert (MP fl.1555), MP for Monmouthshire 1555
William Herbert (Captain), MP for Cardiff 1555 
Sir William Herbert (planter) (died 1593), Elizabethan planter in Ireland and MP for Monmouthshire 1584–1597
William Herbert (died 1645), Welsh politician, MP for Cardiff 1621
William Herbert (Royalist) (died 1642), Welsh politician, MP for Cardiff 1640
William Herbert (died 1646) (1621–1646), English politician, MP for Monmouthshire 1640
William Herbert (of Coldbrook) (died 1646), Welsh politician, MP for Monmouthshire 1626
William Herbert (British Army officer) (c. 1696–1757), general and Member of Parliament
William Herbert (antiquarian) (1771–1851), English librarian and antiquary
William Herbert (bibliographer) (1718–1795), editor of Typographical Antiquities by Joseph Ames
William Herbert (botanist) (1778–1847), British botanist, poet, and clergyman
William Norman Herbert (1880–1949), British general

See also
Herbert (surname)